SKY is a Latin alphabet keyboard layout for typing Japanese developed in 1987. The name comes from the fact that the keys S, K, and Y are under the user's fingers in the homerow of the left hand. According to the creator, SKY stands for “Simplified Keyboard for You”.

Description 
The basic arrangement of SKY published in “Journal of Information Processing Society” is :
 ,   W   R   M   H   UU   AI   OU   .   EI  
 N   T   S   K   Y   U    A    O    I   E  
 P   D   Z   G   B   UN   AN   ON   IN  EN

The left hand is responsible for consonants, the right hand is for vowels. As a result, almost alternating left and right keying is possible like in Dvorak simplified keyboard.

The layout only has 30 keys so that you can type punctuation without changing keyboard layouts. The implementation is simple since you don’t have to press the shift key at the same time as your keystroke. It conserves keystrokes and also has a high ratio of hand alternation. It rarely requires the use of the same finger twice in a row in a vertical motion so more text can be input in the same amount of time.

Sources 
 Yoshio Shiratori, Fumihiko Obashi et al., “New Key Arrangement for Japanese Input and its Evaluation of Operability” (Information Processing Society of Japan Vol. 28 No. 6 p. 658 - 667, 1987).

Keyboard layouts
Latin-script keyboard layouts